USS Engstrom (DE-50) was an Evarts class destroyer escort constructed for the United States Navy during World War II. She was sent off into the Pacific Ocean to protect convoys and other ships from Japanese submarines and fighter aircraft. She performed escort and antisubmarine operations in dangerous battle areas and returned home safely to the States.

She was launched on 24 July 1942 by Philadelphia Navy Yard as HMS Drury (BDE-50); reallocated to the USN; assigned the name Engstrom on 4 March 1943; and commissioned on 21 June 1943.

Namesake
Warren Leonard Engstrom was born on 5 January 1921 in Superior, Wisconsin. He was a member of the United States Naval Academy class of 1942, which was graduated in December 1941. Just prior to his death he had been appointed Lieutenant (junior grade).

Service history

World War II
Engstrom sailed from Philadelphia, Pennsylvania, on 20 August 1943 for Norfolk, Virginia, where she joined a convoy bound for the Panama Canal Zone and San Diego, California, arriving on the west coast on 9 September. On the 27th, she got underway for Adak and over a year of duty in northern waters. Often fighting weather almost as dangerous as the enemy, she escorted combatant and auxiliary ships, acted as radar picket ship for air operations between Attu and Paramushiro, and screened surveying ships.

The escort vessel returned to Mare Island, California, on 19 January 1945 for overhaul and, after training at Pearl Harbor, sailed on convoy duty to Eniwetok and Saipan, her base from 31 March through the end of the war for escort assignments to Eniwetok, Ulithi, Guam, and Iwo Jima. The men and supplies, whose movement she guarded, saw action on Okinawa.

Postwar
From 12 September-11 October 1945, Engstrom patrolled out of Guam. She reached San Pedro, Los Angeles on 24 October, and was decommissioned on 19 December 1945, being sold on 26 December 1946.

Awards

References

External links
NavSource Online: Destroyer Escort Photo Archive - USS Engstrom (DE-50)

Evarts-class destroyer escorts
World War II frigates and destroyer escorts of the United States
Ships built in Philadelphia
1942 ships